The O2 is a large entertainment district on the Greenwich peninsula in South East London, England, including an indoor arena, a music club, a Cineworld cinema, an exhibition space, piazzas, bars, and restaurants. It was built largely within the former Millennium Dome, a large dome-shaped canopy built to house an exhibition celebrating the turn of the third millennium; consequently The Dome remains a name in common usage for the venue. It is sometimes referred to as The O2 Arena, but that name properly refers to the indoor arena within The O2. Naming rights to the district were purchased by the mobile telephone provider O2 from its developers, Anschutz Entertainment Group (AEG), during the development of the district. AEG owns the long-term lease on the O2 Arena and surrounding leisure space.

From the closure of the original Millennium Experience exhibition occupying the site, several ways of reusing the Millennium Dome's shell were proposed and then rejected. The renaming of the Dome in 2005 gave publicity to its transition into an entertainment district. The Dome's shell remained in situ, but its interior and the area around North Greenwich Station, the QE2 pier and the main entrance area were completely redeveloped.

The area is served by North Greenwich tube station on the Jubilee line, which was opened just before the millennium exhibition, and by bus routes. Thames Clippers operate a river boat service for London River Services; the present tenants, AEG, purchased Thames Clippers in order to provide river links between central London and The O2. As well as a commuter service, Thames Clippers operates the O2 Express service. Local buses also serve the station and the nearby O2.

On 23 February 2017, O2 announced that they had agreed to a deal with AEG to maintain the naming rights of The O2 for a further 10 years until 2027.

The tent
The dome-shaped structure, which now houses The O2's Entertainment Avenue and arena, was originally constructed as the Millennium Dome and housed the Millennium Experience, a major exhibition to celebrate the start of the third millennium. The exhibition opened to the public on 1 January 2000 and ran until 31 December 2000; however, the project and exhibition was the subject of considerable political controversy and it did not attract the number of visitors anticipated, leading to recurring financial problems.

Background to development

In December 2001, the government announced that Meridian Delta had been chosen to develop the Dome as a sports and entertainment centre. Meridian Delta, a subsidiary of Quintain and Lendlease, signed a 999-year lease for the Dome with the government and English Partnerships, a UK governmental body for national regeneration which was assigned the regeneration of the Greenwich Peninsula.

The Dome was sub-leased to Anschutz Entertainment Group (AEG) for 58 years. AEG would develop and operate The O2 during the length of the lease, while the government was entitled to a 15% share of profits for 25 years. The O2 was developed inside the Dome structure by AEG to a design by Populous and Buro Happold at a cost of £350 million.

In 2008, the functions of English Partnerships were transferred to the Homes & Communities Agency, and in 2009, Quintain and Lend Lease sold their interest in Meridian Delta to Trinity College, Cambridge for £24 million.

As part of the investment programme, naming rights were sold to O2, and 'The O2' became the official name of the project on 25 May 2005, and in 2017 O2's name sponsorship was extended for a further ten years. The £6 million per year deal between O2 and AEG included priority tickets and reserved VIP accommodation for O2 mobile customers. The service was also made available to premium ticket holders. O2 started talks with AEG in 2005 to have its logo and branding placed on the roof of the dome, but this did not take place.

AEG have stated that they wish to abolish the 'Dome' name due to its reputation as a failed project, being tagged as 'The White Elephant.' Since its opening, there have been signs of the press and public calling it The O2. It is currently the largest entertainment district in London. To mark its opening, AEG spent £6.5 million on a mass advertising campaign, led by VCCP, throughout Europe to promote The O2.

Construction
The development took place in the form of new buildings being built inside the dome structure. The dome structure was not changed as part of the construction with the exception of blue lights being added to the support poles and plasma displays being added to some of the large sculptures around the dome. Construction started with the arena roof, which was built on the ground and then raised, as cranes could not be used in the dome structure. The construction then moved on to the arena building itself and the entertainment avenue around the arena building. A wide pathway between North Greenwich station and The O2 was also built, as well as the Peninsula Square piazza in front of the dome for special events. A glass roof was built over part of the pathway so that people can walk from the station to The O2 without getting wet in rain. A covered path was also built between the QE2 Pier and The O2's main entrance. Buro Happold provided structural engineering for the project. The main civil engineering and construction contract for the development was awarded to Sir Robert McAlpine.  Watson Steel Structures provided engineering for the 4,500 tonne arena roof. M-E Engineers were the building services engineers for the project. T. Clarke were the electrical contractors.

OR Consulting engineers set up a few interactive exhibitions within The O2. Keller Ground engineering prepared the ground for construction. Special ground preparation was necessary due to the contaminated soils from the industrial works which existed at the site before the dome. Catalytic converters were also installed within the dome to prevent toxic gases due to the dome structure being left in place. The plant cylinders, containing services equipment, and some piles used for the original dome, were reused. Financial consulting was provided by WT Partnership and EC Harris. The Waterfront partnership provided legal support for the development and continues to do so for The O2. Kerzner International helped with the development of the entertainment venues.

Super casino proposals
Anschutz planned to build a super casino as one of the attractions, which would lead to further development of the area. The casino was to be developed and operated by Kerzner International. The association of the British Deputy Prime Minister, John Prescott, with Philip Anschutz, head of the entertainment group, gave rise to political controversy, with allegations that Prescott may have used undue influence to support Anschutz's casino licence bid. Prescott had met Anschutz on several occasions and stayed in his ranch for a few days. In August 2006, it was reported that construction of the shell of The O2's casino site had already started. In January 2007 the single trial licence for a British super casino was granted to Manchester. Consequently, AEG announced that the casino would not be built in the near future, and that there would not be enough investment for a high-rise hotel, designed by Richard Rogers, as well as a theatre, a cable car from Canary Wharf and an extended development that was planned adjacent to the dome.

The Icon Outlet 
In late 2018, AEG, in association with property firm Crosstree Real Estate Partners, opened a premium retail outlet at the O2, called the Icon Outlet. The centre, which 'completes the loop' at the venue, is set over 210,000 sq.feet and takes up a section of the O2 that was previously intended to house a supercasino.

The new shopping centre opened its doors in October 2018 with thirty stores, however, that number has since increased to over 60. Brands at the Icon Outlet include Levi's, Ted Baker, GANT, Asics, Adidas, Nike, Hackett, Tommy Hilfiger, Skechers and Jack Wills. The venue also includes a cafe (Cloud Nine), a store that organises sample sales (Showcase.co.)

Potential developments 
In late 2007 marine engineering consultancy Beckett Rankine was appointed to investigate the possibility of a cruise ship terminal being built.

In 2012 it was reported that the O2 would be sold by its owners AEG, as part of the disposal of the entire company's assets, rumoured to be valued around $7 billion.

Opening

The venue, rebranded The O2, was reopened to the public on 24 June 2007 with a concert by Bon Jovi in the arena. The O2 celebrated its first year with a book, including a double page picture of Elton John from his September 2007 Red Piano show.
Prior to this reopening, other events took place, including a soft opening for residents of the area to explore the entertainment district and an opening for staff called "The O2 Premiere" which featured Peter Kay, Tom Jones, Kaiser Chiefs and Basement Jaxx. An event called "Out of the Blue" featuring circus acts also took place on the day of the public opening, as part of the Greenwich Festival.

Facilities

Various buildings are housed within the dome structure including an arena, known as The O2 Arena, smaller venue indigo at The O2, Hollywood Bowl, Cineworld, Sky Studios and an Entertainment Avenue consisting of various restaurants and bars. A new shopping outlet opened in 2018. Backstage there is also a VIP club lounge, operations rooms, a media centre with high definition facilities and a number of dressing rooms, as well as a VIP entrance/exit for performers.

All the venues in the complex use the latest lighting, sound and security technology, including RFID smart card tagging of staff and VIP guests, and digitally managed sound. There are four computer server rooms to provide this technology.

The complex is also covered by CCTV and security personnel. Arena visitors and their bags are screened with X-ray machines and metal detectors at the main entrance.

The O2 Arena

The O2 Arena (referred to as the North Greenwich Arena for the 2012 Summer Olympics and Paralympics) is a 20,000 capacity venue, primarily used for live music. It is located at the centre of The O2 and is the first American-style, multi-purpose arena in London. It is the second largest arena in the UK after the Manchester Arena, but is the busiest music venue in the world.

The arena and its facilities are housed in an independent building within the dome structure. The arena has hosted multiple kinds of music and sporting events and in 2008 exceeded ticket sales for both Madison Square Garden and the Manchester Arena.

indigo at The O2 
"indigo at The O2" is a 2,750 capacity live music club for smaller music events, club events, after shows, corporate and private events. It contains four bars: two on the main ground floor area in front of the stage, one in the VIP lounge called the Purple Lounge and one in the stalls, called Bleachers. The Purple Lounge is not in direct view of the stage, but guests have access to "Kings Row", the best seats in the venue. indigo at The O2 is managed by Ansco Music Club limited (the business name of the indigo part of AEG Live).

The venue hosted "An Audience with Bill Clinton" in 2007. Comedians such as Andy Parsons and Roy Chubby Brown have performed at indigo. Classic FM hosted several shows throughout 2008. The venue hosted the 'bootcamp' sessions for the reality TV show, The X Factor during the 2008, Series 5 season, and in 2010 was used for the debut of the snooker format, Power Snooker. In 2012 it was the venue for a performance by South Korean pop rock band CN Blue. The indigo also hosted the 2020 BDO World Darts Championship.

The O2 bubble
The O2 Bubble was a two-storey bubble-shaped exhibition space built to museum standards, which opened in November 2007. It was made from ETFE, the same material used for the Eden Project, and the bubble itself was reportedly based on the Eden Project. Tutankhamen and the Golden Age of the Pharaohs was the first exhibition in the Bubble and after that was Body Worlds. In October 2009 it was Michael Jackson: The Official Exhibition, a collection of Jackson's personal items from his estate and Neverland Ranch, costumes and props from his tours and videos.

In 2009, the third floor of the bubble became an exhibition called the British Music Experience, a sixty-year retrospective of British popular music. The space, no longer named The O2 Bubble, has hosted various exhibitions including Star Wars Identities, My Name is Prince, Elvis on Tour, and DC Exhibition: Dawn of Super Heroes, and currently hosts ABBA: Super Troupers The Exhibition.

The Avenue

The Entertainment Avenue is a wide pedestrian avenue within The O2, with artificial palm trees and other decorations, built around the circular arena building which takes up the centre of the dome structure. The entertainment avenue has buildings on either side, which are leased to tenants who run bars and restaurants, and resembles a shopping centre.

The buildings on the Entertainment Avenue include a music club known as indigo at The O2, an exhibition space, a cinema managed by Cineworld and 26 bars and restaurants. The cinema includes 11 screens over 2 levels including one 770 capacity auditorium (Sky Super Screen) which is the third largest screen, by screen-size, in London, and the sixth largest screen in the UK. It uses the vista ticketing system, where tickets can be purchased from any stall selling refreshments. Cineworld began operating the cinema, taking over from Vue in 2010.

Fast food outlets have been banned from the development as the theme is 'aspirational but accessible', trying to avoid it being seen as a shopping centre but more like Covent Garden.

Up at The O2
Announced in 2011, Up at The O2 officially opened on 21 June 2012. It involves an expedition across the roof of The O2 along a 190m long tensile fabric walkway. Halfway, a central platform provides 360-degree views of the city, before a descent down to the base of the venue on the other side. From the platform, visitors can see the Olympic Park, Thames Barrier, Historic Royal Greenwich and Canary Wharf.

Mamma Mia! the Party
In the summer of 2019, a new Mamma Mia! themed attraction opened at the O2. MAMMA MIA! THE PARTY was based on a popular Swedish show of the same name, which had enjoyed a successful run at the Tyrol Restaurant in Stockholm.
Taking its cue from the mega successful movie and theatre production Mamma Mia!, the show relocated the action to a Greek Taverna on the island of Skopelos. The show, which includes a full three course meal, tells the story of taverna owner Nikos and his wife Kate over one night at their family owned restaurant.The show was adapted for the London stage by TV celebrity Sandi Toksvig.

Indoor events space
The O2 also has one multi-purpose indoor events space for live music and night clubbing. Competing with other similar events spaces such as Brixton Academy, the club is called Building Six (formerly Matter & Proud2).

Outdoor event spaces
Special events or minor events which did not require or could not be held in the indoor venues were held in the piazzas – The London Piazza, Peninsula Square outside the main entrance of The O2, and the area around the main entrance. The London Piazza, which had featured an indoor beach, ice rink and dry ski slope, was replaced by the Icon shopping outlet.

Hollywood Bowl
Hollywood Bowl is a boutique bowling alley and arcade games space within The O2. It also hosts a VR Zone Portal.

Chronology of the site
1994: The Millennium Commission is established by prime minister John Major and handed over to deputy prime minister Michael Heseltine.
January 1996: A site on the Greenwich Peninsula is selected. Birmingham, Derby and Stratford, London were also considered.
May 1999: North Greenwich tube station opens as part of the Jubilee Line Extension, connecting the site to the rest of  London by the Underground.
22 June 1999: The structure of the Dome is completed.
1 January 2000: The site opens to the public as the Millennium Experience, containing an exhibition to celebrate the third millennium.
31 December 2000: The Millennium Experience (and the Dome) closes to the public at the end of 2000.
18 December 2001: Announcement of sale of the site to Meridian Delta, who plan to turn it into a 20,000-seat sports and entertainment venue. Houses and offices will be built on the surrounding land, subject to the consent of the London Borough of Greenwich.
31 May 2005: Anschutz Entertainment Group sell the naming rights to the former Millennium Dome to O2 plc, a British mobile phone company.
23 June 2007: The 'O2 premiere' private event opens to staff. Peter Kay, Tom Jones, Kaiser Chiefs and Basement Jaxx perform.
24 June 2007: The O2 opens to the public. Bon Jovi is the first band to play the new The O2 Arena.
2 September 2007: Disney Channel's High School Musical 2 premieres at The O2; it is the first movie to premiere at the venue.
6 April 2008: The Olympic torch relay passes The O2.
13 July 2009 - 6 March 2010: On 13 July 2009, Michael Jackson was scheduled to hold a 50-show residency at the arena, titled This Is It. However, the concerts were cancelled following Jackson's death on 25 June 2009. Less than 3 weeks before the first "This Is It" show was due to begin in London.
7 June 2010: Bon Jovi become the first band to play on the roof of The O2 to commemorate the beginning of their 12-night residency in the arena.
21 June 2012: Up at The O2 officially opened.
20 October 2018: The Icon Outlet shopping centre opens at The O2.
18 February 2022: The O2’s fabric roof sustained severe damage from exposure to wind speeds of at least  during Storm Eunice, which tore open several sections of the roof.

Transport links

See also
Tensile architecture
Tensile structure

Notes and references

External links

 – official site
The O2 Floor plan
Detailed report of the dome and Greenwich Peninsula regeneration scheme published by the National Audit Office

Greenwich MM – MEX – The Dome – The O2 On-going site that documents the run up to the MEX and, now, to The O2

Buildings and structures in the Royal Borough of Greenwich
Tensile membrane structures
Buildings and structures celebrating the third millennium
Richard Rogers buildings
Domes
Music venues in London
Redevelopment projects in London
Entertainment districts in the United Kingdom
Tourist attractions in the Royal Borough of Greenwich
Squash venues
O2 (UK)
Darts venues
Music venues completed in 2007
2007 establishments in England